Adriano Paroli (born 30 March 1962) is an Italian politician and lawyer, former Mayor of Brescia from 2008 to 2013.

Biography 
Graduated in Law at the University of Milan, Paroli joined Communion and Liberation when he was very young. He has been elected to the city council of Brescia with the Christian Democracy in 1991.

Paroli joined Silvio Berlusconi's Forza Italia in 1994 and ran for the office of president of the province of Brescia, without being elected. He was later elected in the Chamber of Deputies in the 1996, 2001, 2006 and 2008 general election.

In 2008 Paroli was elected Mayor of Brescia, defeating the centre-left candidate Emilio Del Bono. He ran for a second term in 2013 but he was defeated by Del Bono.

In the 2018 general election Paroli has been elected to the Senate.

Electoral history

References

External links 
Files about his parliamentary activities (in Italian): XIII, XIV, XV, XVI, XVIII legislature

1962 births
Living people
Christian Democracy (Italy) politicians
Forza Italia politicians
The People of Freedom politicians
20th-century Italian politicians
21st-century Italian politicians
Mayors of Brescia
University of Milan alumni
Forza Italia (2013) senators